Stewart Byron "Stu" Gilliam (July 27, 1933 – October 11, 2013) was an American actor and stand-up and TV comedian.

Biography
Stewart Byron Gilliam was born in a middle-class area of Detroit, the grandson of a church minister. He left home at the age of 14 to perform with a circus as ventriloquist in state fairs, then after a few years began to appear in clubs in Chicago. During his two-year service in the Korean War, he entertained troops as a ventriloquist. In the 1950s/60s he performed his act in clubs nationwide with black audiences, including the Apollo Theater in New York City. He sometimes performed for mixed-race shows, but in Southern states was prevented from appearing onstage at the same time as white performers. Finally, the Playboy Club circuit placed him before largely white crowds, including in the South.

Gilliam appeared on national television in the 1960s, including The Ed Sullivan Show, Playboy After Dark, and The Dean Martin Show. He did stand-up work and TV and film appearances in the 1960s and 1970s. In 1968, he was paired with Don Adams and Robert Culp in Get Smart as Agent Samuels (really Kubacek, a double agent in deep disguise) in "Die, Spy", a spoof of the television series I Spy. He was the voice of Freddie "Curly" Neal on the Hanna-Barbera cartoon series Harlem Globetrotters in the early seventies. Gilliam was a panelist on the first season of the game show Match Game '73 (episodes 41-45 and 51-56).

Gilliam co-starred in the CBS sitcom Roll Out during the 1973–74 season. Also starring Hilly Hicks, and featuring Ed Begley, Jr. and Garrett Morris, the series was set in France during World War II and was loosely based on the 1952 film Red Ball Express.

He married Vivian Baravalle in 2007 and moved to her residence in the Czech Republic. He died of a heart attack in České Budějovice on October 11, 2013, aged 80. He had been suffering from lung cancer and COPD. He is buried in Boršov nad Vltavou.

References

External links

1933 births
2013 deaths
Male actors from Detroit
American stand-up comedians
American television actors
Deaths from cancer in the Czech Republic
Deaths from lung cancer
Deaths from emphysema